Indradhanush (English: Rainbow) is  an Indian children's television series that aired on DD National channel. The series  was produced and directed by Anand Mahendroo. It also featured several young actors like Karan Johar, Urmila Matondkar, Vishal Singh, Ashutosh Gowarikar, and Akshay Anand.
The show used tracks from Maurice Jarre's score for A Passage to India.

Plot 
The shows follows the story of a group of kids, who assemble a computer. The computer becomes the host to an alien prince from a planet in the Andromeda Galaxy on the run from his enemies. The following events take a lot of weird turns leading to one of the friends, Appu, getting kidnapped by one of the enemies of the Prince. The Prince gives the friends a time-travel machine. With this machine they travel to the past and future (1942 and 2013) to rescue their friend.

Cast 
 Jitendra Rajpal as Appuswamy Krishnamurthy, known as Appu
 Girish Karnad as Krishnamurthy Appuswamy, Appu's Father
 Deepa Lagoo as Mrs. Ishwari Krishnamurthy, Appu's mother
 Akshay Anand as Balachandran Krishnamurthy, known as Bala, Appu's elder brother
 Vishal Singh as Shoaib, Appu's friend
 Karan Johar as Srikant, Appu's classmate and close friend 
 Sagar Arya as Appu's friend
 Kamla Devi as Saroja Appuswamy, Appu's Grandmother
 Sridevi Mukhi as Jayashree Krishnamurthy, Appu and Bala's elder sister, a doctor
 Ameesha Jhaveri as Preeti, Appu's classmate

Guests
 Ashutosh Gowariker as Mr. Appuswamy, Appu and Bala's grandfather
 Urmila Matondkar as Sunita Shirodkar, Cloned Bala's girlfriend in future
 Vikram Gokhale as a professor, who creates a clone from Bala's DNA.
 Siraj Syed as Seth Jamnadas
 Vishwajeet Pradhan as Joseph
 Gavin Packard as Android
 Daryl Packard as Joshua
 Brij Gopal as Raja

Production

Karan Johar, who played Srikant, has revealed that one of the lead roles in the series was offered to Shah Rukh Khan.

Episodes

Reception 
The show was an instant hit and kept viewers hooked because of its fresh content. It is still considered an important show in the history of Indian television.

References

External links 

Indian children's television series
DD National original programming
Indian science fiction television series
1989 Indian television series debuts
1989 Indian television series endings